An aimag, originally a Mongolian word meaning 'tribe', is an administrative subdivision in Mongolia, Russia, and in the Inner Mongolia region of China.

Mongolia 

In Mongolia, an aimag is the first-level administrative subdivision. The country currently has 21 aimags. The capital Ulan Bator is administrated as an independent municipality.

During the Qing dynasty, Khalkha was subdivided into four aimags (Setsen Khan Aimag, Tüsheet Khan Aimag, Sain Noyon Khan Aimag and Zasagt Khan Aimag). An aimag was further subdivided into "banners" (khoshuu). Each aimag had an assembly of the local nobility, commonly named "league" in English (chuulga in Mongolian).
This administrative structure was kept until 1930, when the current structure with smaller aimags, subdivided into sums, was introduced.

Inner Mongolia 

In Inner Mongolia, aimags (in the Inner Mongolian context, usually translated as "league", from ) are a prefecture-level subdivision, first-level when seen from Inner Mongolia and second-level when seen from the whole of China. Currently, Inner Mongolia has three aimags:  Xilin Gol, Hinggan, and Alxa. Inner Mongolian aimags are subdivided into banners  (khoshuu in Mongolian, 旗 in Chinese) and further into sums (苏木 in Chinese).

During the Qing dynasty, Inner Mongolia was divided into six assemblies of the local nobility (chuulga in Mongolian; 盟 in Chinese). After 1949, this structure was largely kept, except that in Mongolian, the term chuulga was replaced by aimag, and that several aimags were added. Beginning in the 1980s, most aimags have been converted into prefecture level cities.

Russia 
In some federal subjects of Russia, municipal districts are called aimags:
 in the Altai Republic;
 in the Republic of Buryatia;
 in the Republic of Mordovia (Erzya and );
 in the Republic of Khakassia.

See also
 Sum (country subdivision)
 Mongolia under Qing rule
 Administrative divisions of Mongolia during Qing

References

External links 
 https://web.archive.org/web/20190721213924/http://www.mongolmessenger.mn/

Types of administrative division